Subcutaneous fat necrosis may refer to:
 Pancreatic panniculitis
 Subcutaneous fat necrosis of the newborn

Conditions of the subcutaneous fat